Villejuif–Louis Aragon is a station of the Paris Métro, located in the commune of Villejuif.

History
The station opened on 28 February 1985 when Line 7 was extended from Le Kremlin-Bicêtre and serves the commune of Villejuif as the southwestern terminus of one of Paris Métro Line 7's branches (the terminus on the other branch is Mairie d'Ivry).

The station is named after the Avenue Louis Aragon and Louis Aragon (1897–1982), a French writer.

Early plans to extend line 14 from Olympiades to the Orly Airport included the possibility of taking over the existing line 7 branch from Maison Blanche to this station. However, the inclusion of line 14 in the Grand Paris Express project means that the line 14 extension to Orly will only consist of new infrastructure and the plan has been shelved. Line 15 (another Grand Paris Express line) will serve this station from late 2025 onwards (as of August 2021), one year later than originally intended in 2024, with construction having started in 2017.

In 2020, the station was used by 4,029,467 passengers amidst the COVID-19 pandemic, making it the 28th busiest of the Métro network, out of 305 stations.

Passenger services

Access 
 Access 1: Avenue de Stalingrad - with an elevator leading to a connection with the T7 tram.
 Access 2: Boulevard Maxime Gorki - equipped with an elevator and a fixed staircase indicated by a mast with the yellow M logo.
 Access 3: Avenue Louis Aragon - with a fixed staircase.
 Access 4: Gare routière - with two fixed stairs, one of which is indicated by a mast with the yellow M logo.

Station layout

Platforms 
 Villejuif - Louis Aragon has a standard configuration with 2 tracks surrounded by 2 side platforms. Villejuif - Louis Aragon is a standard configuration station: it has two platforms separated by the metro tracks, surmounted by a mezzanine. The name of the station is written on enamelled plates. Lighting is provided by suspended luminous globes and neon lights on the mezzanine level. Small ceramic tiles of white and green colour placed vertically cover the walls and tunnel exits. The furniture is the Motte style, in orange.

Other connections 
Since 16 November 2013, it has served as the northern terminus of tram line T7.

The station is served by lines 162, 172, 180, 185, 286, and 380 of the RATP bus network, by line v7 of the Valouette bus network and, at night, by lines N15 and N22 of the Noctilien bus network.

Gallery

References

Paris Métro stations in Villejuif
Railway stations in France opened in 1985